Chione elevata, the Florida cross barred venus, is a species of bivalve in the family Veneridae often confused for another species, Chione cancellata with a more southern distribution.

Distribution
Native to Florida, and northward to N. Carolina -in shallow water.

References

Veneridae